Nona may refer to:

Places
 Nona, Missouri, an unincorporated community in United States
 Nin, Croatia, also known as Nona in Latin
 Roman Catholic Diocese of Nona, which had its see there; now a Latin titular bishopric
 Tor di Nona, a small area in Rome's Rione V called "Ponte"
 Nona River, a river in Assam

Arts and entertainment
 Nona (magazine), a Malaysian women's magazine
 "Nona" (short story), a 1978 story by Stephen King
 the title character of Strega Nona, a children's book by Tomie dePaola
 La Nona, a 1979 Argentine film
 Nona (2021 film), a animated short film by Pixar
 Nona (2017 film), a film by Michael Polish
 Nona, a 1985-present Malaysian television series on TV3

People
 Nona (given name), a list of people and a figure in Roman mythology
 Nona (surname), an Assyrian surname
 Gajaman Nona, pen name of Ceylonese poet and author Donna Isabella Koraneliya (1746-1815)

Other uses
 Nona (mythology), one of Parcae in classical mythology, equivalent to the Greek Fates
 nona-, a prefix meaning nine
 NONA FC, an American soccer club in USL League Two
 Hurricane Nona, a hurricane during the 1994 Pacific hurricane season
 2S9 Nona, a Russian 120mm (self-propelled) gun-mortar

See also
 The Nona Tapes, a 1995 mockumentary by the grunge band Alice in Chains
 None (liturgy), English for the Latin canonical hour nona
 Nonna (disambiguation)